Sunny Day may refer to:

Music

Albums 
 Sunny Day, by Coco Lee, 1998
 Sunny Day, by Elizabeth Mitchell, 2010

Songs 
 "Sunny Day" (song), by Book of Love, 1991
 "Sunny Day", by Abandoned Pools from Humanistic
 "Sunny Day", by Akon featuring Wyclef Jean from Freedom
 "Sunny Day", by Allure from Sunny Days
 "Sunny Day", by Deana Carter from The Story of My Life
 "Sunny Day", by Jay Chou from Yeh Hui-mei
 "Sunny Day", by Jeanette
 "Sunny Day", by Miquel Brown from Manpower
 "Sunny Day", by Misia from Marvelous
 "Can You Tell Me How to Get to Sesame Street?", often referred to by its opening line, "Sunny day / Sweepin' the clouds away..."

Television 
 Sunny Day (TV series), a children's animated television series
 Sunny Day, a character in the television series Hawaiian Eye

See also 
 
 
 Sunny D, a beverage
 Sunny Days (disambiguation)